Homewood may refer to:

Places

Canada
Homewood, Manitoba

United States
Homewood, Alabama
Homewood, California
Homewood, Illinois
Homewood, Kansas
Homewood, Pennsylvania
Homewood (Pittsburgh), three neighborhoods of Pittsburgh, Pennsylvania
Homewood, South Carolina
Homewood, West Virginia

Other uses
Homewood (surname)
Homewood (Ellicott City, Maryland), U.S., a historic house
Homewood, Knebworth, a country house in Hertfordshire, England
The Homewood, a modernist house in Surrey, England
Homewood, Norway, a property in Bærum, Norway
Homewood Campus of Johns Hopkins University, the main campus of The Johns Hopkins University since 1914, in northern Baltimore, Maryland, U.S.A., also referring to the surrounding neighborhood
Homewood Cemetery near Pittsburgh, Pennsylvania 
Homewood Museum, a former estate of Charles Carroll of Homewood
Homewood Memorial Gardens near Chicago
Homewood Mountain Resort, a ski area in Lake Tahoe, Nevada
Homewood National Historic Site, a National Historic Site of Canada in Maitland, Ontario
Homewood Suites by Hilton, a chain of hotels
Homewood Plantation (Natchez, Mississippi), an antebellum plantation near Natchez, Mississippi
Homewood (typeface) a type face cut by Baltimore Type Foundry